The Guida dei monti d'Italia (in English Guidebook to the Italian mountains) is a series of guidebooks published in Italy by the Club Alpino Italiano (CAI) along with Touring Club Italiano (TCI) in two periods, the first from 1908 to 1932 and the second from 1934 to 2013.

History 
Drafting and writing the guidebooks involved a much editing and many on-site inspections, and the series soon became a reference work both for amateurs and professional alpinists. The serie as a whole was considered monumental, and the novelist Dino Buzzati defined it an arduous and remarkable achievement. The "Guida dei monti d'Italia" is the best example in Italy of a systematic alpinistic guidebook or, in other words, a work describing, as much as possible, all the features and the routes of the mountain groups described in its volumes. In the early 2000s the death of the alpinist Gino Buscaini, who coordinated for a long time the publishing activities, and the resignement of his wife Silvia Metzeltin, who had replaced him for a while, endangered the publication of titles left to complete the coverage of the Italian mountains. Thus in 2007 a group of mountaineering experts addressed an appeal tho the Club Alpino Italiano chairmanship aimed to save the series and to revive it thanks to a new cooperation deal between CAI and TCI. The series was indeed completed with in 2013 with its last volume, Alpi biellesi e valsesiane. Many professionals and enthusiasts in mountainering still own and consult the volumes devoted to the mountain areas of their interest. Some of the older issues of the series nowadays are very difficult to find, and its volumes aren't any more updated.

Titles of the 1st series

Titles of the 2nd series

Note

External links 

 List of the titles on the Club Alpino Italiano website
 Some articles about the history of the seies (part I, part II), Florence section of the Club Alpino Italiano

Alpine guide books
Italian non-fiction books
Mountaineering in Italy
Books about the Alps
Club Alpino Italiano
Mountaineering books